Flagellicaudata is a clade of Dinosauria. It belongs to Sauropoda and includes two families, the Dicraeosauridae and the Diplodocidae.

Phylogeny
The clade Flagellicaudata was erected by Harris and Dodson (2004) for the diplodocoid clade formed by Dicraeosauridae and Diplodocidae in their paper describing a new genus of sauropod dinosaur, Suuwassea. The authors carried out a phylogenetic analysis and noted that Suuwassea, although more derived than Rebbachisauridae, is in a trichotomy with other families belonging to Diplodocoidea (Diplodocidae and Dicraeosauridae). Flagellicaudata was defined as a node-based clade consisting of the most recent common ancestor of Dicraeosaurus and Diplodocus and all of its descendants. The word "Flagellicaudata" refers to long, whip-like tails of that animals (flagellum is a Latin word meaning "whip" and cauda means in Latin "tail").

Fragment of cladogram presented in Harris and Dodson, 2004:

References

 
Diplodocimorpha